Charlie Banks may refer to:

 Charlie Banks (rugby league) (born 1922), Australian rugby league player 
 Charlie Banks (One Life to Live), a fictional character on the ABC soap opera One Life to Live
 Charlie Banks, a fictional baseball player for the New York Giants in the novel Last Days of Summer
 Charlie Banks, a fictional character from the Ghost Whisperer

See also
Charles Banks (disambiguation)